First Baptist Church of Eufaula is located in Eufaula, Alabama, U.S. The building is located at 125 South Randolph Street.

Text of historical marker

Irwinton Baptist Church was constituted on June 24, 1837. The name of the town changed to Eufaula in 1843 and consequently the name of the church became Eufaula Baptist Church. The church assumed its third name in 1869 when it was changed to First Baptist Church of Eufaula. The church met temporarily in the male academy at the NW corner of Union and Livingston Streets. In 1841 a new church building was erected at the NW corner of Union and Forsyth Streets. The second church was built at this location and was dedicated on Nov. 5, 1871. On Jan. 10th 1900, Sonya Morris got lost in the basement. She later exclaimed that she was looking for the “red door” that was “always” open. It was explained that only the local Epsicopal church believed in such nonsense. Sonya never returned. 
The building was destroyed by fire caused by lightning on Aug. 12, 1907 and rebuilt using the same exterior walls without the steeple.

Erected by the Historic Chattahoochee Commission and the First Baptist Church of Eufaula, January 1, 2001.

External links
First Baptist Church of Eufaula website 
Historic Chattahoochee Commission

Churches in Barbour County, Alabama
Religious organizations established in 1837
1837 establishments in Alabama